Tunisia, participated at the 2007 All-Africa Games held in Algiers, the capital city of Algeria. She won 147 medals.

Medal summary

Medal table

See also
 Tunisia at the All-Africa Games

References

Nations at the 2007 All-Africa Games
2007
2007 in Tunisian sport